Wisława or Wislawa is a Polish feminine name: It is the female name of Wisław, and means "great glory".

People
Wisława Szymborska, Polish writer

References

Polish feminine given names